The Hexi tram (opened in 2014) is one of two new tramlines that serve the city of Nanjing, China. These lines are part of the Nanjing tram network, which is an above-ground trolley system in Nanjing. The tram began its first trial run on August 13. The tram was built as part of infrastructure works for the 2014 Summer Youth Olympics.

Overview
The Hexi tram begins at the Nanjing Metro Line 2 Olympic Stadium East station. The terminus is located in Yuzui Wetlands Park area in southern Hexi New District.

The tram runs completely at ground level and features eco-friendly technologies and many modern amenities which include an on-board storage battery, and a pantograph charging system at each of its stations.

Stations

References

Transport in Nanjing
Railway lines opened in 2014
2014 establishments in China